Aachhat is a village located in Girwa Tehsil of Udaipur district in the Indian state of Rajasthan. It has a village code of 106653 and a pincode of 313706.

Statistics 
The village has population of 211 of which 105 are males while 106 are females. The village occupies an area of 59.2 hectares. The literacy rate of the village is 63.98% with males having a higher literacy rate than women. There are about 49 houses in the village. The village is situated at an altitude of 540 meters above sea level and follows IST time. The nearest major city is Udaipur which is situated about 53 kilometers away.

Note: Some of these figures are based on the 2011 Census and may not match with the present day figures.

Culture 
The primary languages spoken are Maithili and Hindi.

Government and administration 
It is administered with the Panchayati Raj system. As per 2009, Bori is the Gram Panchayat of the village. BJP is the major political party throughout the region.

Commute 
There are 2 national highways, NH48 and NH58 that pass through the village. There is no railway station within a 10 km radius of Aachhat. There are 2 nearby rivers, Sukat and Nekhadi which can be used as waterways.

References 

Villages in Udaipur district